Sudhir Gupta (born 19 May 1959) is an Indian politician and member of the Bharatiya Janata Party. He is currently a member of parliament, having been elected twice, in 2014 and 2019, to the Lok Sabha from Mandsour constituency in Madhya Pradesh.

Early life
Gupta was born and raised in Mandsaur. His father, Ramchandra Gupta, was a cloth merchant. He joined the Rashtriya Swayamsevak Sangh organisation and was an active member of Bharatiya Janata Yuva Morcha.

Career
After completing his education, Gupta worked at the Co-operative Bank in Mandsaur. He also worked as a Life Insurance Corporation of India representative. As an office worker for Vishva Hindu Parishad, he participated in the Ram Janmbhoomi Movement and was arrested in the Etawah district of Uttar Pradesh.

He has been associated with Akhil Bhartiya Vaishy Mahasammelan, the Chamber of Commerce, Mandsaur Judo Parishad and the Bharat Vikas Parishad. He has worked as a Saraswati Shishu Mandir administrator.

He was nominated for membership of the Committee on Estimate, the Standing Committees of the Ministry of Commerce, and in the Ministry of Chemicals and Fertilizers in the Government of India.

References

1959 births
Living people
India MPs 2014–2019
India MPs 2019–present
Lok Sabha members from Madhya Pradesh
People from Mandsaur
Bharatiya Janata Party politicians from Madhya Pradesh
Members of the Uttar Pradesh Legislative Council